The 2018 Iowa Corn 300 was an IndyCar Series event held at Iowa Speedway in Newton, Iowa on July 8, 2018. The event served as the 11th round of the 2018 IndyCar Series season. Will Power took his 52nd pole while James Hinchcliffe claimed victory of the 300-lap race, which ended under caution.

Results

Qualifying

Race

Notes:
 Points include 1 point for leading at least 1 lap during a race, an additional 2 points for leading the most race laps, and 1 point for Pole Position.

Championship standings after the race 

Drivers' Championship standings

Manufacturer standings

 Note: Only the top five positions are included.

References 

2018 in IndyCar
2018 in sports in Iowa
July 2018 sports events in the United States